Lieberg Lake is a lake in Blue Earth County, Minnesota, in the United States.

Lieberg Lake was named for Ole P. Lieberg, an early settler.

References

Lakes of Minnesota
Lakes of Blue Earth County, Minnesota